The Val-d'Or Foreurs are a junior ice hockey team based in Val-d'Or, in the region of Abitibi-Témiscamingue, Quebec, Canada. The team was founded for the 1993–94 season of the Quebec Major Junior Hockey League, a member of the Canadian Hockey League. Former Quebec Nordiques and Trois-Rivières Draveurs star, Pierre Aubry was the team's first coach. The literal translation of Val-d'Or Foreurs is "Valley of Gold Drillers"; this name references the drilling operations associated with mining and exploration which are a major source of blue-collar work in the area. The Foreurs play their home games in the Centre Air Creebec.

History
The Foreurs have won the President's Cup three times: in 1997–98, 2000–01 and 2013–14 and consequently have also played for the Memorial Cup each of those years. The team was eliminated in 1998 tournament without advancing from the round robin phase, lost in the 2001 championship game to the Red Deer Rebels and in the 2014 tournament, lost the semi-final in triple overtime to the Edmonton Oil Kings.

In 1996, the Rouyn-Noranda Huskies began play, giving the Foreurs a natural geographical rival in north-western Quebec. Rouyn-Noranda lies approximately 100 kilometres to the west of Val d'Or. Games between the two teams are a major event in the region and draw much larger than average crowds.

NHL alumni

Nicolas Aube-Kubel
Steve Bégin
Antoine Bibeau
Sébastien Bisaillon
Patrick Bordeleau
Luc Bourdon
Sébastien Charpentier
Jean-Pierre Dumont
Benoît Dusablon
Simon Gamache
Julien Gauthier
Jean-Luc Grand-Pierre
Ryan Graves
Samuel Henley
Simon Lajeunesse
Francis Lessard
Kris Letang
Roberto Luongo
Anthony Mantha
Brad Marchand
Brandon Reid
Anthony Richard
Mathieu Roy
Jerome Samson
Maxime Sauvé
Marco Scandella
Jordan Spence
Stéphane Veilleux

Playoffs results

References

External links
 Official web site

1993 establishments in Quebec
Ice hockey clubs established in 1993
Ice hockey teams in Quebec
Quebec Major Junior Hockey League teams
Sport in Abitibi-Témiscamingue
Val-d'Or